Jason Rafael Soloman (born 6 October 1970) is an English retired professional footballer who played as a defender. Soloman made over 100 league appearances for a number of clubs between 1990 and 1997, before playing non-league football.

Career
Born in Welwyn Garden City, Soloman began his career with the youth team of Watford. He also played league football for Peterborough United, Wycombe Wanderers, Wrexham and Fulham. He later played non-league football for Stevenage Borough and Barnet.

External links

Profile at UpThePosh!

1970 births
Living people
English footballers
Watford F.C. players
Peterborough United F.C. players
Wycombe Wanderers F.C. players
Wrexham A.F.C. players
Fulham F.C. players
Stevenage F.C. players
Barnet F.C. players
English Football League players
Sportspeople from Welwyn Garden City
Association football defenders